This is an incomplete list of parks in Corpus Christi, Texas.

This list is incomplete. Please Finish.

Geography of Corpus Christi, Texas
Protected areas of Nueces County, Texas
Tourist attractions in Corpus Christi, Texas